William Kingsland "King" Macy (November 21, 1889 – July 15, 1961) was an American politician from New York.

Background
He was born on November 21, 1889, in New York City. He graduated from Groton School (in Groton, Massachusetts) in 1908, and from Harvard University in 1912.

Career
He engaged in wholesaling and importing from 1912 to 1915, served with the United States Food Administration and War Trade Board from 1917 to 1919, was president of the Union Pacific Tea Co. from 1919 to 1922, was a member of a stock brokerage firm from 1922 to 1938, and was a banker and publisher.

He was Chairman of the Suffolk County Republican Committee from 1926 to 1951; Chairman of the New York State Republican Committee from 1930 to 1934; a delegate to the 1928, 1932, 1940, 1944 and 1948 Republican National Conventions and a delegate to all Republican State Conventions from 1928 to 1946.

He was active in the investigation of the New York State Banking Department in 1929; and also in promoting the Seabury inquiry into the affairs of New York City in 1931 and 1932. He was a Regent of the University of the State of New York from 1941 to 1953, and a member of the New York State Senate (1st D.) in 1946.  Macy's hold over the Suffolk Republican party organization was so complete that he was called "The Little King of Suffolk County".

Macy was elected as a Republican to the 80th and 81st United States Congresses, holding office from January 3, 1947, to January 3, 1951. In 1947–8, he served on the Herter Committee.   He was defeated for re-election in 1950. Afterwards he was Chairman of the Board of the Suffolk Consolidated Press Company and of the Suffolk Broadcasting Corporation.

Death
He died on July 15, 1961, in Islip in 1961, and his remains were placed in a receiving vault at Oakwood Cemetery.

References

 Robert A. Caro, The Power Broker, 1974

1889 births
1961 deaths
People from Islip (town), New York
Groton School alumni
Harvard University alumni
Republican Party New York (state) state senators
Republican Party members of the United States House of Representatives from New York (state)
20th-century American politicians